Shino Matsuda (born 27 March 2001) is a Japanese professional footballer who plays as a defender for WE League club Tokyo Verdy Beleza.

Biography 
Matsuda was born in Chiba Prefecture, Japan. She started playing football at around the age of 3 because of her brother's influence.

Club career 
Matsuda made her WE League debut on 12 September 2021.

References 

Japanese women's footballers
2001 births
Living people
Nippon TV Tokyo Verdy Beleza players
Women's association football defenders
Association football people from Chiba Prefecture
WE League players